Darren Lyon (born 8 June 1995) is a Scottish professional footballer who plays as a midfielder for Kelty Hearts.

He previously played for Hamilton Academical, Peterborough United, Queen of the South and Queen's Park.

Career

Hamilton Academical
Lyon started his career in the Rangers youth academy  and then signed for Hamilton Academical, hoping for first-team football. Lyon debuted for Accies on 15 February 2014.

In April 2015, Lyons signed a new contract with the Accies until the 2017 close season. In November 2015, it was revealed that Lyon would be out of action for six weeks following knee surgery. On 18 November 2017, Lyon scored the Accies second goal in their 2–0 win versus Rangers, marking the Lanarkshire club's first win at Ibrox since 1987.

Lyon departed the Accies in August 2018 after his contract was mutually terminated.

Peterborough United
Later in August 2018, Lyon signed a one-year contract with EFL League One club Peterborough United. Lyon was released by the Posh at the end of the 2018-19 season.

Queen of the South
On 16 August 2019, Lyon signed a one-year contract with Dumfries club Queen of the South.

Queen's Park
On 25 September 2020 he signed for Queen's Park.

Kelty Hearts
Lyon signed for Kelty Hearts in August 2022.

Career statistics

References

1995 births
Living people
Scottish footballers
Rangers F.C. players
Hamilton Academical F.C. players
Peterborough United F.C. players
Queen of the South F.C. players
Scottish Professional Football League players
English Football League players
Association football midfielders
People educated at Bishopbriggs Academy
Queen's Park F.C. players
Kelty Hearts F.C. players